The Trouble with Larry is an American sitcom television series that aired from August 25, 1993 to September 8, 1993 on CBS. It starred Bronson Pinchot as Larry Burton, a man returning home to Syracuse after being presumed dead for many years.  CBS gave the series an early start by premiering it in late August, three weeks after Pinchot's previous series, Perfect Strangers, finished its run on ABC.  However, after poor reviews and three weeks of bad ratings, the series was canceled before the official TV season it was to have been a part of had even begun.

Premise
Larry returns home a decade after he was dragged off by baboons on his honeymoon. His wife, Sally, has now married another man and has a nine-year-old daughter. Larry falls in love with his former sister-in-law, Gabriella, who hates him.

Cast
Bronson Pinchot as Larry Burton
 Courteney Cox as Gabriella Easden
Alex McKenna as Lindsay Flatt
 Perry King as Boyd Flatt
 Shanna Reed as Sally Easden

Episodes

Reception
Reviews for The Trouble with Larry were generally unfavorable, occasionally bordering on hostile. Ken Tucker of Entertainment Weekly gave the show a grade of D+ and called the show "not just not-funny, but actively depressing". Hal Boedeker, writing for the Knight-Ridder newspaper chain, opined that "the moronic sitcom was beyond bad, a disaster that raises doubts about the judgement of CBS executives." David Zurawik of the Baltimore Sun called the show juvenile, and wondered "How did this sitcom (using the word in its most expansive sense) ever make it on the CBS fall schedule?" Frazier Moore of The Seattle Post-Intelligencer wrote that "The Trouble with Larry is a sitcom so feeble yet brazen in its humormongering that it nearly takes the viewer's breath away." The Orlando Sentinel'''s Greg Dawson praised the show's "first-rate" cast, but attacked the pilot's "dead-in-the-water writing" and "nonstop witlesscisms", and called the finished product "sophomoric dreck ... which tests the self-control of anyone with an IQ over 50 and a sledgehammer or handgun in the house."  David Hiltbrand of People, in a review that ran shortly after the show's cancellation, gave the series a C grade.  Hiltbrand had mild praise for the "anarchic" pilot, characterizing the humor as "flip" and "batty", but wrote that subsequent episodes of The Trouble With Larry were mired in "dreary domesticity".

The show ran three episodes before being cancelled following the September 8 broadcast.  Eleven days later, another series co-created by Andrew Nicholls and Darrell Vickers premiered:  It Had to Be You'', starring Faye Dunaway and Robert Urich.  It lasted four episodes, giving Nicholls and Vickers the unusual distinction of overseeing two of the earliest-to-be-cancelled new shows of the same TV season.

References

External links
IMDb
TV.com
TV Guide

1993 American television series debuts
1993 American television series endings
1990s American sitcoms
English-language television shows
Television shows set in New York (state)
CBS original programming
Television series by Warner Bros. Television Studios